Christine de Bruin (née Bushie, born 3 March 1989) is a Canadian bobsledder. She competed in the two-woman event at the 2018 Winter Olympics with Melissa Lotholz. She won bronze in the women's event and a silver medal in the team relay at the 2019 Bobsled World Championships in Whistler, British Columbia.

In January 2022, De Bruin was named to Canada's 2022 Olympic team. De Bruin would go on to win the bronze medal in the inaugural monobob event.

In November 2022, the Canadian Centre for Ethics in Sport announced de Bruin had tested positive for an illicit anabolic agent and had admitted to the violation. She was suspended from training and competition for three years. Signing the admission reduced the ban by one year. de Bruin said she was not financially able to contest the ruling.

References

External links

1989 births
Living people
Canadian female bobsledders
Olympic bobsledders of Canada
Bobsledders at the 2018 Winter Olympics
Bobsledders at the 2022 Winter Olympics
Medalists at the 2022 Winter Olympics
Olympic bronze medalists for Canada
Olympic medalists in bobsleigh
Sportspeople from Edmonton
21st-century Canadian women